Erik Filip Lundberg (13 August 1907 – 14 September 1987) was a Swedish economist, born in Stockholm. He was a professor of political economics at Stockholm University and a member of the Stockholm School of economic thought. He was president of the International Economic Association from 1968 to 1971. From 1969 to 1979, he was a member of the committee that selects the laureates for the Sveriges Riksbank Prize in Economic Sciences, the Economics Prize Committee, and served as the committee's chairman from 1975 to 1979.

Erik Lundberg was the son of mathematician Ph.D. Filip Lundberg (1876-1965) and Astrid Bergstedt. 1931-33 he studied in the United States as Rockefeller Scholar, after his associate degree at Stockholm University, and when he returned to Sweden, he received post at the Riksbank's economic secretariat. In 1934 he was economic planning committee financial advisor in Iceland.

He took his doctorate in 1937 with Studies in the theory of economic expansion, and received the same year employment at the Institute of Economic Research, where he in 1944 became head. He was one of Finance Minister Ernst Wigforss' closest advisers and at that time almost the same time he was appointed the first professor of economics at Stockholm University, a position he held from 1946 to 1965. He was also expert in various state investigations in the 1930s and 40s.

1933-1935 published Lundberg, Ingvar Svennilson and Gösta Bagge, Wages in Sweden 1860-1930 I-II. In his doctoral thesis develops Lundberg the economic theory which Keynes presented in the Treatise of Money, and attempts, mainly by Knut Wicksell's work, combining it with a dynamic aspect, and launching a business cycle and a non-equilibrium theory. In other works he investigates investments dual roles of demand and supply, and stated that this could lead to an imbalance in growth.

The early work studying how the economy is affected by export and import. In Produktivitet och räntabilitet  (The productivity and return on investments) 1961 he coins the phrase "The Horndalseffect" to describe an increase in productivity without investment. In the 1980s, his research focused on the economic crisis and the 1900s major economists' influence on politics.

References

1907 births
1987 deaths
20th-century Swedish  economists
Academic staff of the Stockholm School of Economics
Financial economists
Macroeconomists
Keynesians
Corresponding Fellows of the British Academy
Members of the Royal Swedish Academy of Sciences
Member of the Mont Pelerin Society